The 1907 Victorian Football Association season was the 31st season of the Australian rules football competition. The premiership was won by the Williamstown Football Club, after it defeated West Melbourne in the final by eighteen points. It was the first premiership won by Williamstown, in its 24th season of senior competition.

Premiership 
The home-and-away season was played over eighteen rounds, with each club playing the others twice; then, the top four clubs contested a finals series under the amended Argus system to determine the premiers for the season.

Ladder

Finals

Semi-finals

1907 Final

Notable events

Interleague matches
The Association played two interstate games against the South Australia (represented by the SAFL) during the year. In the first, the Association team fought back from a late three goal deficit to score 3.5 (23) in a row and take a five point lead; but, in the final passage of play, a South Australian rebound led to a mark by Alby Bahr, who kicked a goal after the final bell to win the game for South Australia. The Association won the return game by eleven points.

Other notable events
 West Melbourne moved its home base from the North Melbourne Recreation Reserve to the East Melbourne Cricket Ground for the season, sharing the ground with the Essendon (League) Football Club.
 For the first time, Association players were required to numbers on the backs of their guernseys to enable them to be identified from a distance. Some teams had been voluntarily wearing numbers since 1905, when Port Melbourne was the first to wear them.
 Kicking with the wind in the second quarter of its 22 June match, West Melbourne kicked an inaccurate 0.13 (13) against Footscray's no score; West Melbourne ultimately lost the match 7.6 (48) to 2.19 (31).
 Owing to regular poor behaviour of its home crowds, Port Melbourne was forced by the association to play its final two home games of the season away from the Port Melbourne Cricket Ground.
 On 24 August, Prahran forward Sydney Sykes scored all twelve goals, as well as five behinds, of Prahran's total score of 12.17 (89).
 In the final round match which directly decided which club finished fourth, West Melbourne 8.10 (58) defeated Essendon 8.9 (57) by one point, with Harrison kicking the winning goal for the Wests inside the final minute.
 J. Hutchison set a new record for most goals kicked in a season, breaking Albert Thurgood's record of 64 goals set in 1893. Hutchison kicked 66 goals during the home-and-away season.

External links 
 Victorian Football Association/Victorian Football League history (1877–2008)
 List of VFA/VFL Premiers (1877–2007)

References 

Victorian Football League seasons
VFL